Ahmed Ragab may refer to:

 Ahmed Ragab (satirist) (1928–2014), Egyptian satirist
 Ahmed Ragab (sailor) (born 1991), Egyptian sailor